Jörg Handrick (born 20 July 1968) is a German ice hockey player. He competed in the men's tournament at the 1994 Winter Olympics.

References

External links
 

1968 births
Living people
Olympic ice hockey players of Germany
Ice hockey players at the 1994 Winter Olympics
Sportspeople from Landshut